Benjamin James Bronson (born September 9, 1972) is a former American football wide receiver in the National Football League (NFL) and Arena Football League (AFL). He played in the NFL for the Indianapolis Colts and the AFL for the Houston ThunderBears and Carolina Cobras. He played college football at Baylor.

Bronson also played college baseball at Baylor and professionally in the Kansas City Royals organization from 1996 to 1997.

In 2000, he was named the AFL Breakout Player of the Year. Outside of arena football, Bronson appeared in The Longest Yard (2005).

Bronson is the twin brother to the former American Olympic 400-meter hurdler, John Bryan Bronson, who won the bronze medal at the 1997 World Championships in Athens. Bryan Bronson

References

External links
College stats

1972 births
Living people
People from Jasper, Texas
Players of American football from Texas
American football wide receivers
American football return specialists
Baylor Bears football players
Baylor Bears baseball players
Indianapolis Colts players
Houston ThunderBears players
Carolina Cobras players
Gulf Coast Royals players
Wilmington Blue Rocks players